Central Park is a  municipal park maintained by the city of Louisville, Kentucky. Located in the Old Louisville neighborhood, it was originally the country estate of the DuPont Family. Early in its existence, the park was the site of the Southern Exposition, but later became mostly known for hosting the Kentucky Shakespeare Festival and northern portions of the annual St. James Court Art Show.

History
Interest in developing park space for Louisville's growing population arose in the late 1860s, but it wasn't until the DuPonts decided to open the front lawn of their estate to the public on June 15, 1872 that the city finally got its own park.  Although open only during warm weather months, it was an instant sensation and became immensely popular.  Citizens could enjoy Sunday picnics and fashionable strolls, evening concerts, fireworks displays, balloon ascensions, plays, and much more.  The first known production of a Shakespeare play in the park took place on July 1, 1895 when a national touring company presented As You Like It in the area where the Kentucky Shakespeare Festival's stage is now located.

During the Southern Exposition in 1883, 13 of the park's  were temporarily "roofed in" and used to showcase Thomas Edison's light bulb, one of the first large-scale public displays of the light bulb in the world. In 1885 the park was unroofed, and was instead used as an outdoor exposition, with an Edison-designed electric trolley line transporting visitors around the park to see such sites as a roller coaster, bicycle trails, and an art museum surrounded by a lake.

The park's future became less certain after the murder of the family's patriarch, Alfred DuPont.  A bachelor who enjoyed all the good things that late Victorian culture had to offer, he was a habitué of the night life.  In 1893, while sitting in a chair at a local bordello, he was shot and killed by Maggie Payne, an angry prostitute seeking support for a child she claimed was his.  The local papers covered up the murder, claiming it was a sudden heart attack.  A Cincinnati newspaper later divulged the true cause of death, but it wasn't publicly acknowledged in Louisville until the 1930s.

In the late 1890s, after Alfred's brother Biderman moved to Delaware, the family sought to sell their old estate to the city for a permanent park space, but negotiations dragged on and the family reluctantly began making plans to subdivide it into building lots.  Around that time the city renamed the park DuPont Square, perhaps to encourage the family to keep it a park, but the name never stuck.  Louisville's civic leaders finally stepped up in 1904 and purchased the old estate for $297,500 ($ in  dollars).

The DuPonts had made contingency plans for a public park on their property as early as 1883.  In 1901, they hired nationally renowned landscape architect Frederick Law Olmsted to draw up a ground plan.  Those plans finally came to fruition in 1904–05 when the old DuPont mansion was demolished and the basic outlines of the park as seen today were put into place.  At the time, the Spanish mission style of architecture was in vogue, and Olmsted's firm used it brilliantly in its design of an open-air women and children's shelter and a gymnasium for men and boys complete with a swimming pool in the basement.  It's one of only a handful of Spanish Mission style structures in Louisville.  He also created a wading pool and athletic fields.  The original walking trails from Louisville's 1883 Southern Exposition, which spilled over into the DuPont estate, were kept in place.

In 1970, the gymnasium, by then long gone, was turned into a substation for the Louisville Metro Police Department.  A few years later, the shelter was radically altered.  Its windows were filled in with concrete block and stucco and a drop ceiling installed to cover up the glorious yellow pine ceiling so that it could become an enclosed meeting place for the Old Louisville Neighborhood Council and other neighborhood associations.  (At the time, the council didn't have the funds to do a proper restoration).  In 1976 an amphitheater and wooden playhouse were built. The new playhouse was used to host the free annual summer performances of  William Shakespeare's works, which had been held in the park since 1962.  Since 1988 the annual event has been called the Kentucky Shakespeare Festival and is still free to the public.

In 2004 the park celebrated its centennial. Over the last ten years, due to the financial contributions of the Old Louisville Neighborhood Council, neighborhood associations, and several neighborhood philanthropists, the old women and children's shelter has been restored.  The concrete block and stucco were removed, new windows overlooking the park installed, and the yellow pine ceiling returned to its original splendor.  The park is now fast becoming an entertainment destination.  Besides the popular Shakespeare festival, the park hosts the Old Louisville LIVE concert series, Jazz in Central Park, and an annual Halloween event called Victorian Tales of Terror.

Facilities
Besides the C. Douglass Ramey Amphitheater where the Kentucky Shakespeare Festival is held, the park includes the Old Louisville Visitors Center, a visitors center used to educate visitors from out of town as well as being a community meeting space. There is also the operations center for the Fourth Division of the Louisville Metro Police Department. The park also includes tennis courts and a sprayground.

See also

 History of Louisville, Kentucky
 List of attractions and events in the Louisville metropolitan area
 List of parks in the Louisville metropolitan area
 Louisville Historic District

References

External links
 
 Old Louisville Information Center, located in the park

History of Louisville, Kentucky
Parks in Louisville, Kentucky
World's fair sites in the United States
Frederick Law Olmsted works
Protected areas established in 1905
1905 establishments in Kentucky